This is a list of animals that once lived in the Nordic countries (i.e. Sweden, Norway, Denmark, Finland, and Iceland) but have disappeared since human habitation. The list consists of common name, Latin name, known geographical range, and approximate extinction date, with the "†" symbol indicating the species is considered extinct worldwide.

Arthropods

Insects 
Blotchy mustard pyralid moth, Evergestis frumentalis (Sweden – 2000 AD)
Cattle warble fly, Hypoderma lineatum (Sweden – 2000 AD)
Centaury plume moth, Stenoptilia zophodactyla (Sweden – 2005 AD)
Dry-fungus beetle, Dacne rufifrons (Sweden – 2000 AD)
Emerald leaf beetle, Smaragdina salicina (Sweden – 2000 AD)
Eurasian white admiral, Limenitis camilla (Sweden – 2000 AD)
Everlasting tortrix moth, Eupoecilia cebrana (Sweden – 2000 AD)
Flax fruitborer, Cochylis epilinana (Sweden – 2000 AD)
Flowering rush weevil, Bagous nodulosus (Sweden – 2005 AD)
Gack owlet moth, Trichosea ludifica (Sweden – 2000 AD)
Green-white tuft moth, Nycteola svecica (Sweden – 2000 AD)
Gyllenhaal beetle, Gyrophaena nitidula (Sweden – 2000 AD)
Herbst beetle, Acritus minutus (Sweden / Norway – 2000 AD)
Koch leaf beetle, Psylliodes attenuata (Sweden – 2000 AD)
Large ranunculus, Polymixis flavicincta (Sweden – 2000 AD)
Mediterranean spider wasp, Entomobora crassitarsis (Sweden – 2000 AD)
Müller shield mayfly, Prosopistoma pennigerum (Sweden – 2000 AD)
Oak pinhole borer, Platypus cylindrus (Sweden – 2000 AD)
Orange upperwing, Jodia croceago (Sweden – 2000 AD)
Ox warble fly, Hypoderma bovis (Sweden – 2000 AD)
Pygmy sorrel moth, Enteucha acetosae (Sweden – 2000 AD)
Reddish buff, Acosmetia caliginosa (Sweden – 2000 AD)
Sand sack moth, Coleophora onobrychiella (Sweden – 2000 AD)
Scarce wormwood, Cucullia artemisiae (Sweden – 2010 AD)
Silver-banded ghost moth, Gazoryctra ganna (Sweden – 2000 AD)
Small yellow underwing, Panemeria tenebrata (Sweden – 2000 AD)
Smaller sack moth, Coleophora colutella (Sweden – 2005 AD)
Spotted stoneseed moth, Ethmia dodecea (Sweden – 2010 AD)
Stephens beetle, Philonthus rufipes (Sweden – 2000 AD)
Straw conch, Cochylimorpha straminea (Sweden – 2010 AD)
Sterling owlet moth, Lamprotes caureum (Sweden – 2010 AD)
Tapestry moth, Trichophaga tapetzella (Sweden – 2000 AD)
Triple-spotted clay, Xestia ditrapezium (Sweden – 2000 AD)
Waterhouse beetle, Heterota plumbea (Sweden – 2000 AD)
White geometer moth, Lithostege farinata (Sweden – 2010 AD)
Yellow-spotted ant-like leaf beetle, Phytobaenus amabilis (Sweden – 2000 AD)

Chordates

Amphibians 
European fire-bellied toad, Bombina bombina (Sweden – 1960 AD; populations reintroduced between 1970–1980 are now spread out over Skåne)

Birds 
Atlantic puffin, Fratercula arctica (Sweden / Norway / Denmark / Finland / Iceland – 1970 AD; only extinct in Sweden although occasionally observed along the coasts)
Black stork, Ciconia nigra (Sweden – 2000 AD)
Crested lark, Galerida cristata (Sweden / Denmark – 1980 AD)
Eurasian hoopoe, Upupa epops (Sweden – 2010 AD; regularly observed in the country despite no known breeding populations)
European roller, Coracias garrulus (Sweden – 2000 AD)
†Great auk, Pinguinus impennis (Sweden / Norway / Denmark / Iceland – 1800 AD)
Great bustard, Otis tarda (Sweden – 2000 AD)
Kentish plover, Charadrius alexandrinus (Sweden – 2005 AD)
Middle spotted woodpecker Dendrocoptes medius (Sweden / Norway / Denmark / Finland / Iceland – 1980 AD; occasionally observed in known breeding locations)

Fishes 
Atlantic sturgeon, Acipenser oxyrinchus (Sweden – 1900 AD)
Common skate, Dipturus batis (Sweden – 2010 AD)

Mammals

Bears 
Polar bear, Ursus maritimus (Sweden / Svalbard, Norway / Greenland, Denmark – Quaternary; only extinct in Sweden)

Bovids 
†Aurochs, Bos primigenius (Östergötland and Närke, Sweden / Jylland, Denmark – Quaternary)
†Dwarf ox / dwarf cow, Bos longifrons (Sweden – Quaternary)
European bison, Bison bonasus (Sweden / Denmark – Quaternary; currently working to be reintroduced in both Sweden and Denmark)
Saiga antelope, Saiga tatarica (Sweden / Denmark – Quaternary)

Cats 
†Eurasian cave lion, Panthera spelaea (Sweden / Denmark – Quaternary)
European wildcat, Felis silvestris silvestris (Sweden – 1,700-500 BC)

Deers 
Finnish forest reindeer, Rangifer tarandus fennicus (Sweden / Finland – 1800 AD; populations remain in Finland)
†Irish elk, Megaloceros giganteus (Sweden – Quaternary)
Norwegian fell reindeer, Rangifer tarandus tarandus (Sweden / Norway / Finland – 1800 AD; genetically pure populations remain only in Dovrefjäll-Rondane in Norway)

Dogs 
†Dalbo dog was a Swedish dog breed believed to have gone extinct by 1870 AD.
Gray wolf, Canis lupus (Sweden / Norway / Denmark / Finland – previously extinct in Sweden and Denmark but currently reintroduced)
†Peat dog, Canis familiaris inostranzewi (Denmark – Quaternary)

Horses 
†Forest horse, Equus ferus germanicus (Sweden – Quaternary)
†Tarpan, Equus ferus silvaticus (Sweden – Quaternary)
Wild horse, Equus ferus (Sweden – Quaternary)

Pigs 
Wild boar, Sus scrofa (Sweden / Norway / Denmark / Finland – 1700 AD; previously extinct in Sweden and Denmark but currently reintroduced)

Primates 
†Neanderthal man, Homo neanderthalensis (Wolf Cave, Finland – Quaternary; possibly synonymous with Homo sapiens)

Proboscideans 
†Woolly mammoth, Mammuthus primigenius (Skåne, Sweden / Norway / Danmark / Finland – Quaternary)

Rodents 
Black rat, Rattus rattus (Sweden / Denmark – 1994 AD)

Seals 
Harp seal, Pagophilus groenlandica (Sweden / Greenland, Denmark – Quaternary)

Whales 
Bowhead whale, Balaena mysticetus (Sweden / Norway / Greenland, Denmark – Quaternary)
Gray whale, Eschrichtius robustus (Sweden / Greenland, Denmark – Quaternary)
†Swedenborg whale, Balaena swedenborgii (Bohuslän, Sweden – Quaternary)

Reptiles

Turtles 
European pond turtle, Emys orbicularis (Skåne, Östergötland, and Öland, Sweden / Denmark – 2000 BC in Sweden and 700 BC in Denmark; living turtles have been found in Skåne and Värmland, Sweden, presumably originating as released pets)

Cnidarians

Corals 
Broch coral, Muriceides kuekenthali (Sweden – 2010 AD)

Molluscs

Gastropods 
Marsh grass snail, Vallonia enniensis (Sweden – 2000 AD)

See also 
List of extinct animals
List of extinct animals of Europe

References 

Extinct animals of Europe
Nordics
Nordics